Dominican cuisine is made up of Spanish, indigenous Taíno, Middle Eastern and African influences.

As in Spain, the largest, most important meal of the day is lunch. Its most typical form, nicknamed la bandera ("the flag"), consists of white rice, red beans and meat (beef, chicken, pork, or fish), sometimes accompanied by a side of salad.

Dishes and their origins 
The Dominican Republic was formerly a Spanish colony. Many Spanish traits are still present in the island. Many traditional Spanish dishes have found a new home in the Dominican Republic, some with a twist. African and Taíno dishes still hold strong, some of them unchanged.

All or nearly all food groups are accommodated in typical Dominican cuisine, as it incorporates meat or seafood; grains, especially rice, corn (native to the island), and wheat; vegetables, such as beans and other legumes, potatoes, yuca, or plantains, and salad; dairy products, especially milk and cheese; and fruits, such as oranges, bananas, and mangos. However, there is heaviest consumption of starches and meats, and least of dairy products and non-starchy vegetables.

Sofrito, a sautéed mix including local herbs and spices, is used in many dishes. Throughout the south-central coast bulgur, or whole wheat, is a main ingredient in quipes and tipili, two dishes brought by Levantine Middle Eastern immigrants. Other favorite foods and dishes include chicharrón, yautía, pastelitos or empanadas, batata (sweet potato), pasteles en hoja (ground roots pockets), chimichurris, plátanos maduros (ripe plantain), yuca con mojo (boiled yuca/cassava) and tostones/fritos (fried plantains).

Bouillon cubes are used heavily in the preparation of Dominican lunch food.

Taíno dishes 
Mabí - a root beer-like drink made from the roots of a local tree
Casabe – Flatbread made out of yuca.  Resembles a round cracker.
Pera Piña – Rice and pineapple peel drink. Before rice was introduced it was made with corn and pineapple and called chicha.
Guarapo de Piña – Fermented pineapple juice.
Guanimo – Same as tamales with no filling or stuffed with picadillo.

Spanish dishes 
Arroz con leche –  rice pudding made with long-grain rice, milk, sugar, cinnamon, raisins, star anis, clove, and nutmeg.
Buñuelos de bacalao – a cod fish fritter popular throughout the Caribbean and Latin America. Also known as bacalaíto in the Dominican Republic, a name borrowed from Puerto Rico but nonidentical.
Crème caramel – sweet egg custard known as flan. Coconut flan is known as quesillo de coco.
Gofio – sweet cornmeal powder from the Canary islands.

African dishes 

Mangú –  mashed, boiled plantains can be traced back to west Africa where it is known as fufu. This is a typical and official national breakfast in the Dominican Republic but can also be served at lunch and dinner. Mangú is typically served with queso frito (white cheese fried in a pan), fried Dominican salami, fried eggs and topped with onions cooked in vinegar. This is also known as  los tres golpes (the three hits). Plantains can be replaced with green bananas or squash where it is known as mazamorra.

Middle Eastern dishes 

Few dishes have been adopted from a wave of Lebanese immigration into the Dominican Republic. Drastic changes from the traditional Middle Eastern, starting with the preparation, and just as importantly, using beef instead of lamb, and leaving out many spices (cumin, cardamom, coriander seeds, saffron, and others), herbs (rosemary, mint, dill, marjoram, Greek oregano, and others), spice blends (za'atar and baharat), seeds, and nuts (pine nuts, pistachios, sesame seeds, hazel nuts, and others). Many of these dishes would be served with a sauce while in the Dominican Republic they are served alone. Much of these spices and flavoring have been replaced with Dominican oregano, bell peppers, and chicken bouillon.

Arroz con almendras y pasas – Rice with raisins and almonds. It is usually eaten around Christmas.
Arroz con fideos - Rice cooked with toasted pasta. This dish is eaten with fresh cilantro. 
Kipes or Quipes - Deep fried bulgur roll filled with picadillo.
Niño envuelto – Cabbage roll filled with beef and rice.

Cocolo influence 
Cocolo is a term used in the Spanish-speaking Caribbean to refer to non- Hispanic African descendants, or darker skin people in general. The term originated in the Dominican Republic, and was historically used to refer to the Anglophone and Francophone Caribbean descendants. The Cocolo cuisine brought over through various parts of the Caribbean have influenced Dominican cuisine. Some recipes have changed but most have stood the same but with different names.

Chen-chen – A cracked corn pilaf dish from Haiti that has made its way through the Dominican Republic.
Dumplings - Dumplings in the Dominican Republic are eaten with braised meats or seasoned tomato sauce. They came from the British Caribbean mostly in and around San Pedro de Macorís. Simple recipe including all-purpose flour, water, and salt made into a thick dough before boiling. When cornmeal is added they're known as bollitos de maíz (boiled cornmeal dumplings).
Guavaberry - Guavaberry is used to make jams and drinks.  Guavaberry liqueur, which is made from rum, is a common Christmas drink on many of the islands, particularly in Sint Maarten and the Virgin Islands. The colonists from Denmark and Holland found it could flavor rum by infusion similar to infused schnapps. In the Dominican Republic it is associated with the eastern town of San Pedro de Macorís which has a large population of Eastern Caribbean descent.
Yaniqueque – Jonnycakes, a dish brought by sugarcane workers from the Lesser Antilles over a century ago.

Cuban and Puerto Rican influences 
Dominican cuisine is adopted from Puerto Rico and Cuba, though the dish names differ sometimes. Because of the historic  migration between Cuba, Dominican Republic, and Puerto Rico its three cultures are closely related. It is unclear for most dishes between these countries on where it originated from. Some dishes like mofongo and pastlese are from Puerto Rico and became a part of Dominican cuisine. Moros y Cristianos and yuca con mojo from Cuba. While the Dominican pastelón is seen in Cuba and Puerto Rico.

Asopao – Rice, chicken or fish and vegetable soup similar to Gumbo originating in Puerto Rico. Dominicans have a unique asopao adding chicarron de pollo or coconut milk with seafood. 

Pasteles en hojas – Puerto Rican tamales have been an important part of Dominican Christmas. These tamales are made from plantains, squash, tubers, stuffed with meat and wrapped in banana leaf. 
Majarete – Corn pudding made with fresh blended corn, cornstarch, milk, vanilla and cinnamon. This dessert is claimed by Cuba and Dominican Republic. The only difference is Dominicans add nutmeg while Cubans add lemon zest and raisins. When corn isn't blended it is known as Chaca and can sometimes have rice. 
Mofongo –  Original from Puerto Rico. It is made from fried, boiled or roasted plantains, cassave, or breadfruit mashed with chicharrón and seasoned typically with garlic, fat (olive oil, lard, or butter) and, broth.
Tostones –  known as fritos verdes. They are fried green plantain slices served flattened and salted. Tostones first appeared in Puerto Rico's first cookbook, El Cocinero Puertorriqueño, in 1859. They are tilted as fritos verde. That name is still used only in the Dominican Republic. All three islands claim tostones as their birthplace. 
Yuca con mojo – Boiled or fried cassava with olive oil, oregano, garlic, citrus, onions and cilantro. A classic Cuban dish popular among Dominicans and other Latin countries.

Dominican dishes 
Arepitas – Shredded yuca or cornmeal fritters mixed with eggs, sugar, and anise seeds. Yuca arepitas also go by arañitas "little spiders".
Bollitos de yuca – The recipe is exact to carimañola in Colombia and Panama.
Catibía – Empanada dough made from tapioca flour and water.
Camarones con coco y gengibre – Shrimp with coconut and ginger with Dominican seasoning as a base.
Chicharrón de pollo – This fried chicken dish also goes by pica pollo. Chicken is marinated in lime juice and coated with flour, garlic, and orégano. There are existing recipes with rum or soy sauce as a marine. It is served with tostones and lime.
Chulitos – Fresh grated cassava filled with ground meat and fried.
Chimichurris – The chimichurri is a burger top with slaw made by Argentinean street vendors living in Santo Domingo. It is similar to Argentina sandwiches, in which meat is topped with chimichurri sauce and slaw.
Spaghetti a la Dominicana – Spaghetti  with Dominican salami eaten for breakfast, lunch and dinner.
Pico y pala – Chicken feet and neck is associated with the popular dining rooms and cafeterias, very common in low income neighborhoods. Usually cooked with onions, cilantro, culantro, oregano, and sugar.
Guisados – Meat, fish, beans, or vegetables cooked in a tomato sauce base with Dominican style "sazón". A small amount of sour orange or lime juice, and sugar is traditional added. When done it is served with rice. This is a popular staple in Dominican kitchens, and carnes guisadas are one of the components of the traditional Dominican lunch meal (La Bandera). Carne mechada is braised tenderloin or flank. Brasied oxtail and cow tongue are usually spicy using scotch bonnet or other local chilies. Beans and vegetables are cooked the same but with no citrus added.
Yaroa – Boiled mashed plantains or yuca layerd with meat, melted cheese, with ketchup and mayonnaise on top. Sold on trucks.

Pastelón 
Pastelón can de describe as a casserole or shepherd's pie. A main element of Dominican cuisine. There are more than six variations in the Dominican Republic the most popular ones being pastelón de platano maduro (yellow plantain casserole) and pastelón de yuca (cassava casserole). Pastelón can be found in other Latin American Countries like Puerto Rico, Venezuela, Panama and Cuba, specially the eastern part which has great Dominican influence. Pastelón are usually stuffed with ground meat or chicken.

Pastelón de arroz - Rice, meat, and cheese casserole. 
Pastelón de berenjena - Eggplants are sliced, floured and fried in oil. They are layered with cheese (cheddar and mozzarella are frequently used) and occasionally meat. It's similar to eggplant parmigiana and moussaka but with no sauce. 
Pastelón de maíz - Tamale pie.
Pastelón de plátano maduro - Sweet plantain casserole. 
Pastelón de papa - Shepherd's pie using Dominican spices.

Sauces 
Agrio de naranja - Sour orange juice steeped with oregano, garlic, and chilies. It's concentrated a pique sauce usually paired with soup.
Wasakaka –  Very similar to mojo and chimichurri. The sauce is made by simmering water with garlic, parsley, olive oil, and sour orange. Once cooled it is served with roasted chicken and boiled cassava.

Breads 
Telera – Dominican bread similar to Mexican Telera. Typically served on Christmas. 
Pan de agua 
Pan de coco – Coconut bread show up in many Central American cuisines and Caribbean cuisinines. Particularly in Nicaragua, Venezuela, Honduras, Brazil, Colombia, Guatemala, Jamaica, Puerto Rico and the Dominican Republic. Recipes are the same or similar but results in the same flavor and most of the time texture. It's oragin are between Jamaica and Honduras.
 Pan de mantequilla

Soups 
Dominicans take much pride in their soups and most cooks on the island claim to make the best soup. More than a third of the country's total population lives in poverty, and almost 20 per cent are living in extreme poverty. In rural areas poor people constitute half of the population. Soup in the Dominican Republic is easy, cheap and can feed a large number of people.

Aguají – Plantain puree soup seasoned with sofrito. 
Buche e perico  – Corn chowder. 
Chambre or Chapea – Kidney beans or white beans, rice, pigeon peas, squash, longaniza (sausage), plantains, vegetables, tubers, and sofrito.
Guandules de coco - Pigeon peas stewed in coconut milk, squash, and sofrito. 
Sancocho de guandules - Pigeon peas stewed with squash, sofrito, and pork. 
Sancocho de siete carnes – Seven meat stew is the Dominican Republicans national soup. If beans are added it is known as sancocho de habichuela.
Sopa de mondongo - Beef tripe soup.

Rice 
Most dishes in the Dominican Republic are served with long-grain rice. A popular staple of the Dominican cuisine.

Arroz blanco - White rice. This basic rice can be served with stew beans, braised meat, or soups.
Arroz con maíz or Moro de maíz - Rice with corn combines the sweet flavor of corn with the salty flavor of rice cooked with red onions, orégano and cilantro.
Chofan - Although it's referred to as "Dominican fried rice" there has been no change to its Asian origin, only adding Dominican orégano. 
Concón - Is usually something not cooked on its own. Instead, it is a byproduct of cooking rice. Simply put, it is the layer of burnt hard oily rice left behind when cooking in a caldero (iron pot). Historians have also traced Dominican love for 'concón' from the Nigerian word 'konkon' for oily. 
Locrio - Classic style of mixing rice with other kind of meat.
Moro de guandules con coco - Rice, pigeon peas (guandules), sofrito and coconut milk dish served for Christmas. 
Moro de habichuela - Rice cooked with beans and sofrito in the same pot.

Desserts 

Almibar de frutas – Fruit cooked in syrup. The most popular is called mala rabia. Guava, sweet plantains, and sweet potato with cinnamon.
Arepa – Cornmeal and coconut cake. Dominican arepa is different from that of the Venezuelan and Colombian arepa.
Bizcocho Dominicano – Dominican cake uses a basic cake recipe with vanilla, eggs, flour, sugar, margarine, and baking soda, milk with orange juice and lime zest. When done the cake is then filled with pineapple jam and frosted with meringue.
 Brazo gitano – Rolled sponge cake with guava filling.
Canquiña
Dulce de coco tierno – Fresh coconut cooked slowly with milk, sugar and cinnamon. 
Dulce de Leche en Tabla – Milk fudge usually eaten with pineapple jam.
Habichuelas con dulce – Sweet creamed beans dessert. Made with coconut milk, sweet potato chunks, etc.
Jalea de batata – Sweet potato pudding slowly cooked with spices, sugar, milk, and coconut milk.  
Macaroon – Coconut macaroons are popular all over the island. Jalao are coconut macaroons made with honey and ginger. 
Palitos de coco – Shredded coconut lollipops cooked with condensed milk. When done they are formed into small balls and coated in a simple syrup made from sugar, corn syrup, and red food coloring.
Tres leches cake
Arroz con leche
Flan

Beverages 
The most popular drinks in the Dominican Republic are rum locally known as romo, beer (especially Presidente), coffee, eggnog with rum, local fruit smoothies, mabí  juice made from colubrina bark or fruit that's done all over the Caribbean. Alcohol drinks such as piña colada, coquito, Cuba libre, and mojitos from Cuba and Puerto Rico.

 Batidas – Dominican version of smoothies often made with tropical fruits such as papaya and sapodilla.
Chocolate de maní – Peanut milk, a drink that originated in South America. Modern recipes add spices, sugar, corn, milk, and rum.
Mama Juana – an alcoholic drink concocted by allowing rum, red wine, and honey to soak in a bottle with tree bark and herbs.
Jugo de avena – A spiced oatmeal drink popular throughout South America and the Caribbean. 
Morir Soñando – Evaporated milk, sugar, orange juice, and sometimes added vanilla and lime juice.

Geographical differences 
What Dominicans tend to eat depends highly on where they live: whether near the sea or in the interior mountains. In either case, most Dominican meat dishes tend to involve pork, as pigs are farmed quite heavily on the island. Meat dishes tend to be very well cooked or even stewed in Dominican restaurants, a tradition stemming from the lesser availability of refrigeration on the island.

Seaside Dominican fishing villages will have great varieties of seafood, the most common being shrimp, marlin, mahi-mahi or dorado, and lobster. Most villagers more commonly dine on cheap, lesser-quality fish, usually stewed with la criolla, a type of rice. Premium seafood tends to be too expensive for the many locals, and is saved for the island's upper class and the tourist resorts.

Differences between Dominican cuisine and those of other parts of the West Indies include the milder spicing, which mainly uses onions, garlic, cilantro, cilantro ancho (culantro), ají cubanela (cubanelle pepper), and oregano. Dominican sofrito is known on the island as sazón.

References

Further reading

External links 

 Dominican Cooking
 Dominican Heat
 El Fogoncito

 
Dominican Republic culture
Caribbean cuisine
Latin American cuisine